Pishkuh Rural District is in the Central District of Taft County, Yazd province, Iran. At the National Census of 2006, its population was 4,310 in 1,281 households. There were 4,284 inhabitants in 1,289 households at the following census of 2011. At the most recent census of 2016, the population of the rural district was 4,492 in 1,383 households. The largest of its 150 villages was Eslamiyeh, with 1,655 people.

References 

Taft County

Rural Districts of Yazd Province

Populated places in Yazd Province

Populated places in Taft County